Paolo Serrao (11 April 1830 – 17 March 1907) was a distinguished and influential Italian teacher of musical theory and composition at Naples.

Serrao was born in Filadelfia, Calabria.  As professor of composition at the San Pietro a Maiella Conservatorio at Naples, over many years, he taught many famous Italian musicians, notably Giuseppe Martucci, Umberto Giordano, Leopoldo Mugnone, Michele Esposito, Francesco Cilea, Franco Alfano, Luigi Denza and Alessandro Longo.

He wrote five operas, of which Pergolesi was the most successful. His other compositions include both concert and sacred music.  He died in Naples, aged 76.

Selected works
Opera
 L'impostore, Opera semiseria (1850)
 Leonora dei Bardi, Opera seria (1853)
 Pergolesi, Melodramma semiserio in 3 acts (1857); libretto by Federico Quercia
 La Duchessa di Guisa, Melodramma in 4 acts (1865); libretto by Francesco Maria Piave
 Il Figliuol Prodigo, Opera in 4 acts (1868); libretto by Achille de Lauzières

Orchestral
 Sinfonia

Chamber music
 Andante e Fuga for string quartet
 Elegia for violin (or cello) and piano
 Minuetto for harp or piano

Choral
 Requiem for mixed chorus and orchestra
 Gli Ortonesi in Sciò, Oratorio

Sources 
Arthur Eaglefield Hull, A Dictionary of Modern Music and Musicians (Dent, London 1924).

External links
 
 

Italian classical composers
Italian opera composers
Male opera composers
 01
1830 births
1907 deaths
Italian music theorists
Italian male classical composers
19th-century classical composers
19th-century Italian composers
19th-century Italian male musicians
19th-century musicologists